Stockton Springs Community Church, formerly the Stockton Springs Universalist Church, is a historic church at 20 Church Street in Stockton Springs, Maine.  Built in 1853, it is a fine example of transitional Greek Revival-Italianate architecture, and is particularly noted for the trompe-l'œil frescoes on its walls.  It was listed on the National Register of Historic Places in 1985.

Description and history
The Stockton Springs Community Church is located in the center of Stockton Springs, on the west side of Church Street, just south of its junction with United States Route 1.  It is a single story wood-frame structure, with a gable roof and clapboard siding.  The building corners are pilastered, and the deep eaves are studded with paired brackets.  The main facade is three bays wide, with a central entrance sheltered by a deep gabled pediment.  Windows in the flanking bays are four  narrow sash, in two-over-two pairs with bracketed cornices above.  In the gable there is a small half-round window.  The interior condition (like the exterior) is relatively unaltered, with original pews and pulpit.  It is dominated by the trompe-l'œil frescoes on its walls, which depict classical motifs, with a triumphal arch over the pulpit, and Greek floral designs on the ceiling.

The church was built in 1853 for a Universalist congregation, and the artwork was executed by Boston-based artist William Lawlor.  It is one of four churches in Maine with trompe-l'œil artwork, and is the oldest of those.  The church has served as a non-denominational community church since the 1930s.

See also
National Register of Historic Places listings in Waldo County, Maine

References

Churches in Waldo County, Maine
Churches on the National Register of Historic Places in Maine
Italianate architecture in Maine
Churches completed in 1853
19th-century Unitarian Universalist church buildings
Unitarian Universalist churches in Maine
National Register of Historic Places in Waldo County, Maine
Italianate church buildings in the United States